The following lists events that happened during 1973 in Botswana.

Incumbents
 President: Seretse Khama 
 Vice President: Quett Masire (1966-1980)

Events
 At Selebi-Phikwe, nickel mining commences.

Births
 March 2 - Patrick Lebekwe, Botswana footballer

See also
 History of Botswana
 List of Botswana-related topics
 Outline of Botswana

References

 
Years of the 20th century in Botswana
1970s in Botswana
Botswana
Botswana